This is the progression of world record improvements of the 400 metres W50 division of Masters athletics.

Key

References

Masters Athletics 400 m list

Masters athletics world record progressions